Gastrochilus japonicus, known as Tamra gastrochilus, is a species of orchid. It is native to Japan (including the Ryukyu Islands), Korea, Taiwan and Hong Kong.

References 

japonicus
Orchids of China
Orchids of Japan
Orchids of Korea
Plants described in 1891